Aaku may refer to:
 Aaku, Finnish given name for "Augie", derived from Augustus
 Aa'ku, Western Keresan name for New Mexico's Acoma Pueblo

Finnish masculine given names